Brentson André Buckner (born September 30, 1971) is an American football coach and former defensive tackle who is the defensive line coach for the Jacksonville Jaguars of the National Football League (NFL). He previously served as an assistant coach for the Arizona Cardinals, Oakland Raiders, Tampa Bay Buccaneers and Pittsburgh Steelers.

Playing career

College
Buckner played college football at Clemson University, and was a first-team All-ACC selection in his senior year. In addition to ranking fourth all-time in school history with 46 tackles for a loss, he also set a school record with a 1,220 pound lift on a leg sled.

National Football League

Pittsburgh Steelers
Buckner was selected in the second round (50th overall) of the 1994 NFL Draft by the Pittsburgh Steelers. After missing the first three games of the season, he played in the last 13, and started both playoff games. During one game against the Buffalo Bills, he blocked a field goal. The following season, he was a regular starter for the Steelers, and was an integral part of the defense that led them to Super Bowl XXX against the Dallas Cowboys.

Cincinnati Bengals
In 1997, Buckner was traded to the Kansas City Chiefs during the offseason. He was picked up by the Cincinnati Bengals before the 1997 NFL season. He missed two games that season with an injury suffered against the Steelers, his former team.

San Francisco 49ers
In 1998, Buckner signed with the San Francisco 49ers. He notched his third career blocked field goal against the team he would later play for, the Carolina Panthers. He played with the Niners for three seasons.

Carolina Panthers
In 2001, Buckner signed with the Carolina Panthers, pairing up with Julius Peppers, Mike Rucker and Kris Jenkins to form what many experts called the most dominating front four defensive line in football. The four led the Panthers defense to Super Bowl XXXVIII against the New England Patriots.

On March 1, 2006, Buckner was released by the Panthers.

Post retirement
After retirement, Buckner hosted a midday show on WFNZ in Charlotte, with former NFL Offensive lineman Frank Garcia. The Frank and Buck Show aired weekdays from 11am-3pm. He has also been seen on the NFL Network and ESPN as an NFL analyst.

Coaching career

Northside Christian Academy
In 2008, Buckner was hired as the head coach of the Northside Christian Academy football team in Charlotte, North Carolina along with former NFL players, Myron Bell, Mo Collins, and Omari Jordan who were his assistant coaches.

Pittsburgh Steelers
In 2010, Buckner was hired by the Pittsburgh Steelers as an intern and he would spend three seasons with the team.

Arizona Cardinals
On February 5, 2013, Buckner was hired by the Arizona Cardinals as their defensive line coach under head coach Bruce Arians.

Tampa Bay Buccaneers
On February 19, 2018, Buckner was hired by the Tampa Bay Buccaneers as their defensive line coach.

Oakland Raiders
On January 12, 2019, Buckner was hired by the Oakland Raiders as their defensive line coach, following the Buccaneers' hiring of head coach Bruce Arians. On January 14, 2020, Buckner was fired after one year with the team.

Arizona Cardinals (second stint)
On February 5, 2020, Buckner was hired by the Arizona Cardinals, returning to be their defensive line coach under head coach Kliff Kingsbury.

Jacksonville Jaguars
On February 17, 2022, Buckner was hired by the Jacksonville Jaguars as their defensive line coach under head coach Doug Pederson.

Personal life
Buckner and his wife, Denise, have two daughters, Nia and Nya and a son, Brandon. He also has an older son, Brentson, Jr.

References

External links
Jacksonville Jaguars profile

1971 births
Living people
Sportspeople from Columbus, Georgia
American football defensive tackles
American football defensive ends
Arizona Cardinals coaches
Carolina Panthers players
Cincinnati Bengals players
Clemson Tigers football players
Clemson University alumni
George Washington Carver High School (Columbus, Georgia) alumni
Indoor Football League coaches
Jacksonville Jaguars coaches
Oakland Raiders coaches
Pittsburgh Steelers coaches
Pittsburgh Steelers players
Players of American football from Columbus, Georgia
San Francisco 49ers players
Tampa Bay Buccaneers coaches